Needmore, also known as Rough Log, is an unincorporated community in Pike County, Alabama, United States.

History
The name Needmore is reportedly derived from a local resident who thought the community "needed more of everything." The community was originally known as Rough Log, due to the rapid construction of Pleasant Hill Primitive Baptist Church.

References

Unincorporated communities in Pike County, Alabama
Unincorporated communities in Alabama